is a hereditary noble title (kabane) of ancient Japan. It was given to the descendants of the Imperial Family before Emperor Kōgen. Along with Muraji, Omi was reserved for the head of the most powerful clans during the Kofun period. When the Yamato court was established, the most influential families bearing these two titles were given the title Ōomi and Ōmuraji, respectively.

History 

Examples of Ōomi mentioned in the Nihon Shoki included  during the reign of Emperor Richū,  during the reign of Emperors Yūryaku and Seinei,  during the reign of Emperor Keitai and the four generations of Sogas who dominated the title during the 6th and 7th centuries: Soga no Iname, Soga no Umako, Soga no Emishi and Soga no Iruka.

When the kabane system was reformed into the eight kabane system in 684 following a series of coup attempts, the powerful Omi of the time were given the kabane of Ason, which ranked second under the new system, and Omi itself was dropped to sixth in rank.

Name 
The title denoted supremacy within the court, with titular power belonging to the Ōkimi (later denoted Emperor), whether or not he actually held power.

These same characters of Ōomi are pronounced Daijin to refer to titles beyond 670 A.D. in Daijō-daijin, Sadaijin, Udaijin, Naidaijin, etc.

List of Ōomi 
  (84–?) 
 
  (?–456) 
  (?–?) 
  (?–498)
  (?–529)
  (c. 506–570)
  (551–626)
  (587–645)
  (?–645)

In popular culture 
The name "Omi" holds a superior power in "HvH".

See also

 Gōzoku

References

Ancient Japan
Asuka period
Kofun period
Titles